Mamontovaya Kurya (Russian: Мамонтовая курья, "the mammoth curve") is a Palaeolithic site on the Usa River, Komi Republic, Russia. The site includes stone artifacts, animal bones and a mammoth tusk with human-made marks. Dated to 40,000 years before present, this is the oldest documented evidence of hominin activity at this latitude.

See also
Bluefish Caves

References

Archaeological sites in Russia
Geography of the Komi Republic
Prehistory of the Arctic